Jani Tewelde Weldegaber (born 1 October 1990) is an Eritrean cyclist.

Major results

2008
 1st Stage 7 Tour of Eritrea
2010
 1st Stages 1 & 2 Tour of Eritrea
 3rd Grand Prix of Al Fatah
 5th Overall Tour of Libya
2011
 1st Team time trial, African Continental Road Cycling Championships (with Ferekalsi Debesay, Natnael Berhane and Daniel Teklehaimanot)
 3rd National Time Trial Championships
 3rd Overall Tour of Eritrea
2012
 1st Team time trial, African Continental Road Cycling Championships (with Ferekalsi Debesay, Natnael Berhane and Daniel Teklehaimanot)
 1st Stages 1 & 4 Tour of Eritrea
 3rd National Time Trial Championships
2013
 4th National Road Race Championships

References

1990 births
Living people
Eritrean male cyclists